Bartleby is a 2001 American comedy-drama film adaptation of Herman Melville's short story "Bartleby, the Scrivener". The film was directed by Jonathan Parker, and stars Crispin Glover as Bartleby, and David Paymer as his boss. The film diverges from Melville's story, setting it in a modern office and adding sitcom-style humor, but maintaining an element of surrealism.

Plot 
The film opens with a brief summary of Herman Melville's life; his popularity waning after writing "Moby Dick" and "Bartleby, the Scrivener", Melville could no longer make a living as a writer and took a job as a clerk at the New York Custom House. By the time he died at age 72, almost nobody knew who he was.

While on his way to work one day, the film's narrator, the unnamed manager of a public records office (hereafter referred to as the Boss), sees a forlorn-looking man standing on an overpass. The Boss's office is in a building on top of a large hill, completely inaccessible by foot, and he employs three people: Ernest, an overweight and neurotic klutz; Rocky, who looks and acts like a stereotypical mobster; and Vivian, his verbose, flirtatious, and bluntly honest receptionist. The Boss decides to advertise for a fourth employee to help with an expected increase in workload, but the only person who applies for the job is the man from the overpass, the titular Bartleby. Bartleby explains in his interview that he worked at a dead letter office for eight years until the office moved, but otherwise gives vague answers to the Boss's questions. Bartleby's quiet and off-kilter demeanor unsettles the Boss, but with no other options, he hires Bartleby.

Bartleby initially proves to be a model employee and a boon to the office, getting a week's worth of work done in only a few days. But when asked to help verify important documents, Bartleby refuses, responding with what becomes his answer to every request and one of his only lines for the rest of the film: "I would prefer not to." To the dismay and irritation of the Boss and the other employees, Bartleby refuses to do anything the Boss asks of him, performing his sole task of filing away documents and spending long periods of time staring at a loudly-vibrating vent above his desk. When the Boss brings a date to the office late one night to have sex with her, Bartleby walks in on them, leading the Boss to discover that he has begun living there.

The Boss makes an attempt to reason with Bartleby and to learn something about him; from a picture of a woman the Boss finds in Bartleby's desk, it's implied he had a spouse who either left him or passed away. The Boss also realizes he and the other employees have started using the word "prefer" in their vocabularies. Bartleby soon refuses to do any more filing, now doing nothing at all and claiming that he has "given up working", so the Boss fires Bartleby and gives him until Friday night to leave the office. When the Boss returns on Monday morning, he finds that Bartleby has not left or even touched the paycheck the Boss had given him; tensions start to rise as he and the others wonder why Bartleby is still at the office. During all of this, Vivian becomes close to the Boss's benefactor, City Manager Frank Waxman, but before anything can come of their relationship, he catches her, Ernest, and Rocky all bullying Bartleby. Believing Bartleby to have some kind of mental illness, Waxman takes the matter to the Mayor and the Boss apparently becomes involved in a scandal. Understanding the threat Bartleby poses to his reputation but unable to evict him without proper cause, the Boss moves the office to another building upon realizing that Bartleby's previous employers moved to get rid of him. Before he leaves, the Boss gives Bartleby a glowing letter of recommendation while a repairman removes a dead bird from the vent above Bartleby's desk, fixing the vibration.

The new occupants soon come to ask for help getting rid of Bartleby, who still will not leave and now sits on the stairs all day and sleeps in the lobby at night. The Boss insists that Bartleby is no longer his problem, but relents under the pressure. Speaking to Bartleby again, the Boss offers to help him find a job he would like, but Bartleby refuses to budge and is arrested after the Boss leaves, then released onto the streets after a night in police custody. When the Boss learns of this, he goes searching for Bartleby and finds him weak and delirious from starvation in a homeless camp, having preferred not to eat anymore. To his own surprise, the Boss invites Bartleby to come live with him, but Bartleby refuses yet again. The Boss rushes to a nearby soup kitchen and tries to convince a cook to make sure Bartleby gets fed, but the cook, unsympathetic to Bartleby's plight, forces the Boss to wait in a long line. By the time he returns with food, Bartleby is dead. Finding his letter of recommendation in Bartleby's coat, the Boss bitterly realizes it is now a dead letter and gives the resigned and painful sigh, "Ah, Bartleby. Ah, humanity.", sinking into a depression and finding his way to the overpass from the beginning of the film.

Deeply affected by Bartleby's death, the Boss resigns from his job and writes a memoir which includes his time with Bartleby. The publishing agent he pitches it to, however, finds the subject matter concerning Bartleby too depressing for her tastes and refuses to publish it. The Boss flies into a rage, demanding that Bartleby's story be told, and when the agent tells him to leave, he retorts "I would prefer not to!" Rattled by this, the agent leaves. Finally realizing the impact Bartleby has had on his own life and finding his gaze drawn to a nearby vent, the Boss repeats the phrase again and again as the film closes with a shot of several office buildings, all isolated on top of large hills like his old office.

Cast 
 David Paymer as The Boss
 Crispin Glover as Bartleby
 Glenne Headly as Vivian
 Maury Chaykin as Ernest
 Joe Piscopo as Rocky
 Seymour Cassel as Frank Waxman
 Carrie Snodgress as Book Publisher
 Dick Martin as The Mayor

References

External links 

2001 films
Films based on works by Herman Melville
Films about bureaucracy
Films about businesspeople
Films based on short fiction
2001 comedy-drama films
American comedy-drama films
2000s English-language films
2000s American films